Grand Imperial is a compilation album by American rapper Aceyalone. It was released on Project Blowed and Decon in 2006.

Critical reception
Marisa Brown of AllMusic gave the album 3.5 stars out of 5, praising the RJD2-produced tracks ("Never Come Back", "Angelina Valintina", and "Impact"). She said, "[RJD2 is] really quite talented in his ability to make a diverse set of beats while still sounding like himself, and all three tracks included here continue to prove that." Meanwhile, Steve Juon of RapReviews.com gave the album an 8 out of 10, saying, "Two of the most entertaining tracks may be the live recording of Aceyalone performing 'Makebalillia,' which has an unexpected Michael Jackson twist, and the heavy pounding UK Remix of 'Doin' My Job' produced by The Functionist."

Track listing

References

External links

2006 compilation albums
Aceyalone albums
Decon albums
Albums produced by Z-Trip
Albums produced by RJD2